Edvard Immanuel Hjelt (28 June 1855 – 2 July 1921) was a Finnish chemist, politician and a member of the Senate of Finland. Hjelt studied chemistry in Finland and in Germany and became rector of the University of Helsinki in 1899. He opposed the increasing influence of Russia in the Grand Duchy of Finland and started his career in politics. Good connections to Germany created during his chemistry studies before and after his graduation made it possible for him to get military help during the Finnish Civil War. Hjelt organized the training of the Finnish Jäger troops in Germany.

Early life and education
Hjelt was born in Vihti, Finland. He was the elder brother of August Hjelt. He studied chemistry at the University of Helsinki, and, like most of the chemists of the 19th century, went abroad to improve his education. From 1877 till 1878 he first studied with Johannes Wislicenus at the University of Würzburg, in 1879 with Emil Fischer, Emil Erlenmeyer and Adolf von Baeyer at the University of Munich. After returning to Helsinki he received his Ph.D, but Hjelt needed a second thesis to become a university professor. After another research stay in Germany at the University of Strassburg, working with Rudolph Fittig he prepared that second thesis and became professor for organic chemistry at the University of Helsinki.

University rector
Hjelt served as vice rector of the University of Helsinki from 1896 till 1899 and as rector from 1899 till 1917. The political turmoil after the announcement of the February Manifesto of 1899 by Russian Emperor Nicholas II, which was meant to start a Russification of Finland and tie the Grand Duchy of Finland closer to the Russian empire, induced student demonstrations. The Russian authorities, especially the Finnish Minister Secretary of State Vyacheslav von Plehve and the Governor-General of Finland Nikolay Bobrikov, had to deal with the reactions of the people. Hjelt was able to reduce the pressure on the students and the university and also to stop aggressive reaction of the students to the oppression. With a short relieve after the defeat in the Russo-Japanese War the oppression continued.

Political career
With the start of the First World War Hjeld saw a chance to gain independence from Russia after a defeat of Russia by Germany. Germany on the other hand would benefit from troop withdrawal from the frontline to deal with a Finnish uprising. His good relations with Germany allowed Hjelt to get in contact with leading military personnel to negotiate a German support for Finland. A small group of Finnish volunteers reached Germany via Sweden in 1915. Their training started in autumn 1915; at the end, the group of 2,000 men formed the 27th Jäger Battalion. This unit was the core of the Finnish White Guard during the Finnish Civil War (January to May 1918). On November 26, 1917 Hjelt, together with Adolf von Bonsdorff, met with General Erich Ludendorff and Marshal Paul von Hindenburg at the German army headquarters at Kreuznach to get more help for the coming civil war. Six German battalions landed in Hanko and helped the Finnish army to drive the Red Guards from most of their strongholds.

Hjelt signed a peace treaty between Germany and Finland in Berlin on 7 March 1918. After the end of the civil war he signed a peace treaty with Austria-Hungary. He also searched for a king in the new, planned monarchy of Finland. His first suggestion was Adolf Friedrich, Duke of Mecklenburg-Schwerin, but after Prussian opposition Prince Frederick Charles of Hesse was chosen to become the King of Finland. After the victory of the Allied powers the idea of a monarchy was dropped and Kaarlo Juho Ståhlberg became first president of Finland.

Hjelt's strong connections to Germany and his animosity against France, made him no longer suitable as diplomat after the First World War, in which Germany lost most of its influence to France, the United States and Great Britain.

Works
 Geschichte der organischen Chemie von der ältesten Zeit bis zur Gegenwart : mit 3 Figuren . Vieweg, Braunschweig 1916 Digital edition by the University and State Library Düsseldorf

References

1855 births
1921 deaths
People from Vihti
People from Uusimaa Province (Grand Duchy of Finland)
Young Finnish Party politicians
National Coalition Party politicians
Finnish senators
Finnish chemists
People of the Finnish Civil War (White side)
University of Helsinki alumni
Academic staff of the University of Helsinki
Rectors of the University of Helsinki